Ximena Valero (born Jimena del Carmen Valero Jarillo; May 26, 1977) is a Mexican fashion designer and winner of the 2007 International Award for Designer of the Year for Excellence in Evening Wear at Miami's Fashion Week. She is known for introducing Transformable Fashion and has dressed a number of celebrities. Valero made her name in Tijuana and now lives in Los Angeles. She was recently featured as a designer and judge on The Fashion Hero.

Early life and education
Ximena Valero was born Jimena del Carmen Valero Jarillo in Mexico City, Distrito Federal, Mexico to Carmen Jarillo-Yañez, a school teacher and housewife, and José L. Valero, M.D. a plastic surgeon. Ximena's parents moved to Tijuana, Mexico in 1982. She started studying fashion during summer breaks at the age of 8. It was with her mother's influence that she began to study fashion and couture lessons. At which point, fashion design grew to be her passion, eventually leading her to become a student of fashion design at Fashion Institute of Design and Merchandising, in neighboring San Diego, at the age of 17.

Career
She started designing women's apparel in her first workshop in Tijuana, in the late 1990s. In 1999, she was offered and accepted a paid internship in the design department at Victoria's Secret & Limited Brands by Victoria's Secret CEO Grace Nichols. After her internship ended she started working in New York as a free-lance fashion designer.  In early 2006, she moved back to the Tijuana-San Diego area. During the following two years, she developed new designs incorporating Frida Kalhlo's look into her apparel creations and also designed women's shoes and pets apparel.

By late 2007, she moved to Los Angeles, where she has her current workshop and showroom studio. During 2007 and 2008, she has appeared in several Fashion Week shows around Latin America and the US, and was the  winner of the 2007 International Award for Designer of the Year for Excellence in Evening Wear in 2007's Miami's Fashion Week. On October 14, 2008, she was appointed one of 15 members of 2008's Tijuana's Hall of Fame, at the Canaco (National Chamber of Commerce), selected by the Tijuana's Image Committee, headed by Tijuana's tycoon,  José Galicot Behar.

Transformable Fashion
Her major contribution to fashion in 2009 was so-called "Transformable Fashion," that is, women's apparel that can be worn in many different ways. On her innovation, she recalled, "I was running out of clothes. So I repurposed what we had. Then I thought, what if I made original designs with that transformability in mind?" Valero went on to design a long line of Transformable Fashion women's outfits that can be worn in multiple ways.

Reality television
Ximena Valero was featured as a designer and judge on The Fashion Hero, hosted by Brooke Hogan. It is available on Amazon Prime. She has also been featured on a number of television and internet programs.

Celebrities dressed
According to various online and print publications, Valero has dressed a number of high-profile celebrities in her career:

 Alicia Keys – Composer, Musician
 Katy Perry – Pop idol, Singer
 Jessica Alba – Actress
 Jessica Biel – Actress
 Lindsay Lohan – Actress
 Eva Longoria – Actress
 Daisy Fuentes – TV Host / Personality
 Ciara – Rapper, Singer
 Ariana Savalas – American Jazz Singer
 Paulina Rubio – Pop Singer
 Fernanda Romero – Actress
 Alejandra Guzman – Mexican Singer
 Lorena Rojas – Mexican Actress
 Daniela Kosan – E entertainment TV host
 Melanie Brown – Spice Girl
 Guadalupe Pineda – Mexican singer
 Patricia de Leon – Actress
 Diana Garcia – Mexican actress
 Leryn Franco – Olympic Javelin Thrower
 Cynthia Olavarria – Miss Universe First Runner Up
 Alejandra Espinoza – TV Host
 Barbara Mori – Actress
 Belinda – Pop Idol
 Ninel Conde – Singer/Actress
 Jaslene Gonzalez – American Next Top Model
 Solange Knowles – Singer
 Debbie Berebichez – Scientist
 Jackie Tohn – American actress
 Margherita Missoni – Designer for Missoni
 Zuleyka Rivera – Miss Universe
 Nadine Velazquez – Film Actress, Model
 Ana de la Reguera – Mexican Actress
 Katie Cassidy – American Actress
 Ximena Sarinana – Singer
 Barbara Islas – Mexican TV Host Actress
 Cari Lee – Painter and Socialite
 Janice Dickinson – Supermodel
 Heather Marks – Supermodel
 Melissa Haro – Supermodel
 Cintia Dicker – Supermodel
 Tiiu Tulk – Supermodel
 Juliana Imai – Supermodel

References

1977 births
Living people
Mexican fashion designers
Mexican women fashion designers
People from Mexico City